Penicillium scabrosum is a species of fungus in the genus Penicillium. Described as new to science in 1990, it was first isolated from soil associated with corn in Denmark. It has also been found in soil samples from other temperate areas of the world, including Canada. The fungus is a spoilage organism for foods, particularly those with lipid- and cereal-containing feed. It produces several mycotoxins, including fumagillin, viridicatin, and viridicatol. P. scabrosum is classified in Penicillium subgenus Penicillium, section Divaricatum, series Atroveneta.

References

Fungi described in 1990
Fungi of Europe
Fungi of Canada
scabrosum
Fungi without expected TNC conservation status